The Urech hydantoin synthesis is the chemical reaction of amino acids with potassium cyanate and hydrochloric acid to give hydantoins.

Reaction mechanism

See also
Bucherer–Bergs reaction

References

External links
  English translation of 1873 German article 'on lactyl amino acids and lactyl ureas' by Friedrich Urech

Condensation reactions
Nitrogen heterocycle forming reactions
Heterocycle forming reactions
Hydantoins

Name reactions